Juraj Bellan (born 30 January 1996) is a Slovak racing cyclist, who currently rides for UCI Continental team .

Major results

2013
 National Junior Road Championships
2nd Time trial
2nd Road race
2014
 1st  Time trial, National Junior Road Championships
2015
 National Under-23 Road Championships
2nd Time trial
3rd Road race
2017
 4th Overall Grand Prix Chantal Biya
1st Stage 4
 National Road Championships
4th Time trial
9th Road race
2018
 1st  Mountains classification Carpathian Couriers Race
 National Road Championships
6th Road race
7th Time trial

References

External links

1996 births
Living people
Slovak male cyclists
Place of birth missing (living people)
European Games competitors for Slovakia
Cyclists at the 2019 European Games